Newport School District (NSD) is a public school district based in Newport, Arkansas. Established in 1876, NSD supports more than 1,500 students in prekindergarten through grade 12 in the 2010–11 school year by employing more than 260 faculty and staff on a full time equivalent basis for its five schools.

The school district encompasses  of land in Jackson County and serves all of Newport, Amagon, Beedeville, Jacksonport, Tupelo, and Weldon, and portions of Diaz.

History 
The Beedeville School District consolidated into the Newport School District on July 1, 1985.

Athletics 
Newport competes in interscholastic activities at the junior high and high schools in the 4A West conference administered by the Arkansas Activities Association.

Schools 
 Newport High School, serving grades 7 through 12.
 Newport Ełementary School, serving prekindergarten through grade 6.

Further reading
  (Download) - Includes boundaries of predecessor school districts

References

External links
 

Education in Jackson County, Arkansas
School districts in Arkansas
Newport, Arkansas
1876 establishments in Arkansas
School districts established in 1876